Sons of the Forest is an upcoming survival video game developed by Endnight Games and published by Newnight. It is the sequel to the 2018 video game The Forest, and was released via early access on February 23, 2023, for Microsoft Windows on Steam.

Gameplay
Similarly to The Forest, Sons of the Forest puts players in control of a protagonist stranded on an island inhabited by cannibals. Players can build weapons and buildings to aid in their survival. New to the game are friendly NPCs. One is a companion named Kelvin, who is deaf and unable to speak. Players can give Kelvin written commands on a piece of paper to help with simple tasks such as collecting crafting resources or setting up fires. Players will also encounter Virginia, a three-legged, three-armed woman who can be equipped with weapons to aid in combat situations. The map in this game is four times bigger than that of its predecessor. The game supports up to eight-player cooperative multiplayer, though players can also opt to play the game solo. Depending on their actions, players can receive different endings.

Synopsis
Many years after the events at Site 1, a team of mercenaries hired by PuffCorp is dispatched to an island called "Site 2" to search for PuffCorp's founder Edward Puffton, his wife Barbara, and daughter Virginia, who have gone missing for months now. The team's helicopters are shot down by unknown assailants. One of the mercenaries survives their helicopter crash but is knocked out by a man wearing a silver coat. The Mercenary then awakes with another surviving mercenary named Kelvin who was rendered deaf in the crash. 

Working together, the Mercenary and Kelvin set up camp and obtain resources to survive the wilderness as well as attacks from mutant cannibals. As the Mercenary begins to explore the island, they find various underground bunkers and facilities built by PuffCorp and learns more about the true nature of Site 2 and PuffCorp's intentions for it. Like Site 1, Site 2 possesses ancient artifacts of unknown power, as well as a previously undiscovered golden ore. PuffCorp acquired the island under the guise of turning it into a resort, and are in secret competition with the owners of Site 1, Sahara Therapeutics, over control of an artifact known as the "Cube". The Mercenary also finds surveillance footage showing Edward and PuffCorp executives suddenly mutating into cannibals during a dinner party, meaning the cannibals were Site 2's previous inhabitants.

The Mercenary also encounters Virginia, a mutant who somehow managed to retain her mind and sanity. Searching another bunker, the Mercenary also comes across Tim and Eric LeBlanc, the son and father from The Forest, who were also hired by PuffCorp to search for the Pufftons. However, the Mercenary is separated from them when the man with the silver coat accosts the LeBlancs and the Mercenary is knocked unconscious by a mutant. The Mercenary then continues to explore the PuffCorp facilities, eventually discovering research notes on the Cube referencing its potential to travel between alternate dimensions. The Mercenary also learns that the Cube will "activate" every eight lunar cycles, and the only safe haven is inside the Cube itself. The Mercenary deduces that the Cube's activation was what caused the mass mutations on the island, and the next activation is due soon.

Along the way to the Cube, they encounter a different type of highly aggressive mutant that shows an aversion to crucifixes. The Mercenary eventually reaches the Cube along with Tim and they both make it inside the Cube before it closes, locking the man with the silver coat outside. When the Cube activates, Tim has a seizure and briefly splits into multiple versions of himself before the Cube shows them a vision of a futuristic, alien city. The Cube then deactivates and reopens, showing the man with the silver coat having mutated. The Mercenary and Tim then return to the surface where Eric is waiting in a helicopter, and two endings are possible:

 If the player decides to go retrieve their survival pack, the Mercenary decides to stay behind on the island, and the LeBlancs leave without them. 
 If the player decides to board the helicopter, the Mercenary leaves the island with the LeBlancs. If Kelvin and Virginia survived and accompanied the Mercenary to the Cube, they will leave on the helicopter as well.

Development
Sons of the Forest was delayed twice. Announced in December 2019, the game had an initial May 2022 release date. On March 25, 2022, the game was delayed to October of that year "to be able to deliver our vision of the next step in survival games", according to the developer Endnight Games. That August, the game was delayed again to its final release date of February 23, 2023. It was later announced on February 3, 2023, that the game will launch in early access to avoid further delays.

Reception

Sons of the Forest surpassed Starfield as the most wishlisted game on Steam. The game sold over 2 million copies within 24 hours of release, and had over 250,000 concurrent players on Steam during its launch day. It became the best-selling game on Steam at the time.

IGN said that "Sons of the Forest takes everything its predecessor did well and does it a little bit better," including the improved AI, larger map, and graphics, but noted poor performance optimization and an unfinished story.

References

2020s horror video games
Castaways in fiction
Deaf culture
Early access video games
First-person shooters
Indie video games
Multiplayer and single-player video games
Open-world video games
Survival video games
Upcoming video games scheduled for 2023
Video games about cannibalism
Video games developed in Canada
Video game sequels
Video games set in forests
Video games set on fictional islands
Windows games
Works about missing people